Erast R. Huculak,  (December 3, 1930 – March 2, 2013) was a Canadian businessman, public figure and philanthropist of Ukrainian descent. President of Medical Pharmacies Group. He was the founder of the Canadian Children of Chornobyl Foundation and head of the Ukrainian Canadian Congress in Oshawa (1966; 1973–1974). In 1993 he served as an adviser to the Prime Minister of Ukraine. From 2004 to 2013 he was the Honorary Consul of Ukraine in Canada.

Biography 
Huculak was born in Rivne, Second Polish Republic (nowadays – Ukraine). He was the son of the historian and geographer Mykhailo Hutsulyak.

In the summer of 1948 he emigrated with his family to Vancouver, British Columbia. Erast graduated from King Edward High School and then studied at the Faculty of Pharmacy at the University of British Columbia. After graduating from university in 1955, he opened a small pharmacy in Oshawa, which later grew into the "Medical Pharmacies Group". At the age of 35, Huculak became a millionaire.

He was one of co-founders of Canadian Children of Chornobyl Foundation. In 1966 and from 1973 to 1974 he served as a head of the Ukrainian Canadian Congress in Oshawa. In 1989, he established the Huculak Chair of Ukrainian Culture and Ethnography at the University of Alberta.

In 1993 he was appointed as an Adviser to the Prime Minister of Ukraine. From 2004 to 2013 he was the Honorary Consul of Ukraine in Canada.

Erast Huculak died on March 2, 2013, in Toronto, Ontario.

Awards 
In 2001 Huculak received an honorary degree from the University of Alberta.

  2001: Second Class of the Order of Merit of the Ukraine
  2006: Member of the Order of Canada
  2013: Queen Elizabeth II Diamond Jubilee Medal

References 

1930 births
2013 deaths
Businesspeople from Toronto
University of British Columbia alumni
Recipients of the Order of Merit (Ukraine), 2nd class
Members of the Order of Canada
Ukrainian emigrants to Canada
Canadian pharmaceutical industry businesspeople
Canadian philanthropists